Michael Vey: Storm of Lightning is the fifth book in Richard Paul Evans series Michael Vey, a heptalogy. It was released in September 2015.

Sequel
The sequel to this book, Michael Vey: Fall of Hades, was published on September 13, 2016.

Plot
The book opens with Timepiece Ranch, the headquarters of the resistance being attacked by the Elgen. The ranch is completely destroyed, but was also completely empty. There were no deaths, besides those on the side of the Elgen. When the head EGG, Welch, of the Elgen informs Dr. Hatch that the mission was a failure and that the Electroclan escaped with Jade Dragon, Dr. Hatch shows little visible reaction. He instead informs his EGG about his plans to take over the island nations of Tuvalu and make that his home base of operations. He then arrests Welch, strips him of his title and restrains him, intending to feed Welch to his electric rats once they reach Tuvalu.

Michael and the Electroclan return to America after rescuing Jade Dragon. They are distraught over the news that Timepiece Ranch was attacked since Michael and Taylor's Mom and Ostin's parents were at the ranch. They immediately want to investigate and get revenge. Scott, the pilot and resistance member, persuades them to lay low in a small town on the Mexican border named Naco and to wait for him to try to contact other resistance members and make a plan to visit Timepiece Ranch. During the time they spend in Naco, Michael encounters some local gang members, and while fighting them off, produces electric sparks all over his body that leave scars known as Lichtenberg figures. 

There is a side story in this book involving Taylor's Dad being brought in for questioning about the disappearance of his wife and daughter. He is told that he is a prime suspect in the disappearance and is given proof that his wife has been lying to him about her whereabouts. 

The Electroclan and Scott eventually make the trip to Timepiece Ranch and with the help of Ian's powers, ascertain that there are no human remains except for a wounded Elgen soldier. After interrogating the soldier, they take him to a hospital and make their way back to America to wait for further instructions. They are soon visited by Gervaso, the resistance's head military man and strategist. Gervaso informs them of their parents' safety, and of the Elgen plans to take over Tuvalu. The Electroclan eventually head to another resistance stronghold, Christmas Ranch to plan their next attack on the Elgen.

Meanwhile, back at their Taiwanese boat dock, Quentin, Tara, Bryan, Kylee and Torstyn learn of Welch's arrest and impending doom. Having grown up with Welch, and seeing him as a father figure, Quentin is distraught over the news. He works with Tara to break Welch out of the Elgen prison. Later Hatch reveals his wish for Quentin to lead the attack on the radio tower in Tuvalu, to cut off the islands from outside communication as a first step to taking over the island nation. 

The Electroclan spends their time at Christmas Ranch devising a plan to stop Hatch in his attempt to become King of Tuvalu.

While Hatch wines and dines with dignitaries of Tuvalu, Quentin leads the capture of the islands using Elgen forces. Hatch then tells the Tuvaluan leaders that he now controls their islands and they will now be renamed the Hatch Islands. He informs the Prime Minister, Saluni, that to refer to the islands as Tuvalu will be punished and then informs Saluni that due to his refusal to bow to Hatch, his tongue will be cut out and he will be placed naked in a cage of monkeys and forever be referred to as "The Prime Monkey of Hatch."

Hatch later learns of the betrayal of Tara and Quentin, and Torstyn by helping Welch escape, and has them arrested and imprisoned. He places Quentin in the monkey cage next to Saluni. 

The book ends with Michael and the Electroclan, with the help of the resistance, planning their most daring mission yet to stop Hatch.

Characters
 Michael Vey - The main protagonist of the story. Leader of the Electroclan. Has Tourette's Syndrome. Can shock people, creates lightning balls, absorb electricity from other electric children, and basically becomes a human magnet Also can cut through metal.
 Ostin Liss - Michael's best friend. Member of the Electroclan. Is extremely intelligent. Not electric.
 Taylor Ridley - Michael's girlfriend. Member of the Electroclan. Can "reboot" people's brains and also read minds by touching someone.
 Jack Vranes - Member of the Electroclan. Not electric. Extremely strong and is excellent with cars.
 Ian - Member of the Electroclan. Can see through things using electrolocation.
 McKenna - Member of the Electroclan. Creates heat and light at will.
 Abigail - Member of the Electroclan. Can stop pain by touching someone, simulating parts of the brain.
 Zeus - Member of the Electroclan. Can shoot lightning-bolts from his fingertips.
 Tessa - Member of the Electroclan. Can enhance the powers of the electric children.
 Tanner - Member of the Electroclan has the powers to bring down planes and helicopters
 Nichelle - Member of the Electroclan. Can detect and drain other electric children's powers.
 Dr. Hatch - The main antagonist of the story. The Admiral-General of the Elgen Army. Not electric.
 Tara - Taylor's evil sister. Is loyal to Dr. Hatch. Can disrupt electronic brain functions. Creates mental illusions. Also creates emotions in a person on specific parts of the brain.
 Torstyn - Loyal to Dr. Hatch. Creates microwaves.
 Quentin - Loyal to Dr. Hatch. Creates isolated electromagnetic pulses.
 Bryan - Loyal to Dr. Hatch. Creates highly focused electricity allowing him to cut through anything.
 Kylee - Loyal to Dr. Hatch. Creates electromagnetic power. Is a human magnet.
Cassy - Loyal to the Voice. Can freeze people with her electric powers.
Grace - Loyal to the Electroclan. Can store information like a flash drive.
 Scott- Resistance Pilot
Gervaso - Resistance Military Leader and Strategist
 Charles Ridley - Taylor's Dad
 Julie Ridley - Taylor's Mom
 Welch - Head EGG of Elgen Clan
 Simon - Chairman of the Resistance
 Sharon - Michael's Mom

References

External links 
 Michael Vey Official Site
 Richard Paul Evans Official Website

2015 American novels
2015 science fiction novels
American science fiction novels
American young adult novels
Storm of Lightning, Michael Vay
Sequel novels
Superhero novels
Novels set in fictional countries
Simon & Schuster books